The 16th Annual Nickelodeon Kids' Choice Awards was held on April 12, 2003, hosted by Rosie O'Donnell. The award show was held in the Barker Hangar at the Santa Monica Airport in Santa Monica, California. This was the last time O'Donnell would host the awards. By this point, she had hosted the awards seven times in a row. The announcers were Daran Norris and Susanne Blakeslee from The Fairly OddParents, who used their Cosmo and Wanda voices, respectively, for the event.

Justin Timberlake highlighted the show by performing his hit "Rock Your Body". Later, B2K performed a "That Girl"/"Girlfriend" medley with Marques Houston.

Winners and nominees
Winners are listed first, in bold. Other nominees are in alphabetical order.

Movies

Television

Music

Sports

Others

Best Burp
Justin Timberlake

Wannabe Award
Will Smith

References

External links
 

Nickelodeon Kids' Choice Awards
Kids' Choice Awards
Kids' Choice Awards
Kids' Choice Awards